Why Darwin Matters: The Case Against Intelligent Design is a 2006 book by Michael Shermer, a historian of science. Shermer argues that intelligent design is bad science, that different fields of science converge in supporting evolution, and that religion and science are not in conflict. As a former young Earth creationist, Shermer explores the beliefs and critiques the claims behind it.

Christopher Hitchens commented on the book, "With his forensic and polemical skill, he could have left them for dead: instead he generously urges them to stop wasting their time (and ours) and do some real work." Steven Pinker wrote it is "A readable and well-researched book on what is perhaps the most vital scientific topic of our age. Anyone who has been snowed into thinking that there is a real scientific controversy over evolution by natural selection will be enlightened by Why Darwin Matters, which is both genial and intellectually uncompromising." Robert Lee Hotz, for the Los Angeles Times explained "None writes so fiercely in defense of evolution as Shermer... With the sustained indignation of a former creationist, Shermer is savage about the shortcomings of intelligent design and eloquent about the spirituality of science. In Why Darwin Matters, he has assembled an invaluable primer for anyone caught up in an argument with a well-intentioned intelligent design advocate."

Jim Walker wrote, "This book should appeal to Christians who want to understand evolution but who do not want to feel offended by the anti-religious tone of some evolutionary scientists. Shermer carefully explains, in a non-threatening manner, how evolution and natural selection works while also explaining why Intelligent Design theory cannot explain the diversity of life on the planet earth."

References

External links
Why Darwin Matters from MichaelShermer.com

2006 in science
2006 non-fiction books
Books about Charles Darwin
Books by Michael Shermer
Criticism of intelligent design
English-language books
Popular science books
Scientific skepticism mass media